Nu Med is an album by the Israeli electronica-world fusion trio Balkan Beat Box.

Track listing 
All tracks written by Tamir Muskat/Ori Kaplan, except tracks 2, 5, 9, and 13, by Tamir Muskat/Ori Kaplan/Tomer Yosef.

References

Balkan Beat Box albums
2007 albums
JDub Records albums